Jared Odenbeck (born February 4, 1995) is an American soccer player who currently plays as a midfielder for Ljungskile SK in the Division 1 Södra.

Career

College & Amateur
Odenbeck began playing college soccer at Georgetown University in 2013, where he stayed for one season, before transferring to Wake Forest University.

While at college, Odenbeck appeared in the USL PDL for Southern California Seahorses in 2014, and Charlotte Eagles in 2015 and 2016.

Professional
On March 8, 2017, Odenbeck joined United Soccer League side Charlotte Independence. After leaving Charlotte, Odenbeck moved to Sweden to play the latter half of the year with Lindome GIF.

Odenbeck temporarily returned to the United States in 2018, playing with USL PDL side South Georgia Tormenta, before heading back to Sweden again to play with IK Kongahälla.

2019 saw Odenbeck play in New Zealand with Western Suburbs.

In September 2019, Odenbeck signed for NISA side Stumptown Athletic ahead of the league's inaugural season. Odenbeck signed on loan with FC Tucson on February 24, 2021.

References

External links
 Profile at Georgetown University Athletics
 Profile at Wake Forest University Athletics
 USL profile
 Stumptown Athletic profile 

1995 births
Living people
American soccer players
American expatriate soccer players
Expatriate footballers in Sweden
American expatriate sportspeople in Sweden
Expatriate association footballers in New Zealand
American expatriate sportspeople in New Zealand
Association football midfielders
Georgetown Hoyas men's soccer players
Wake Forest Demon Deacons men's soccer players
Southern California Seahorses players
Charlotte Eagles players
Charlotte Independence players
Tormenta FC players
FC Tucson players
Soccer players from Charlotte, North Carolina
USL League One players
USL League Two players
National Independent Soccer Association players